Two ships of the Royal Navy have been named HMS Worthing:

, requisitioned in 1939, renamed Brigadier in 1940 and returned to owners in 1946.
, a  launched in 1941 and sold in 1948.

References

Royal Navy ship names